Pleasanton High School may refer to:

Pleasanton High School (Nebraska), a public high school located in Pleasanton, Nebraska
Pleasanton High School (Pleasanton, Texas), a public high school located in Pleasanton, Texas, U.S.

See also
Pleasanton (disambiguation)